Wheatland Township is the name of some places in the U.S. state of Michigan:

 Wheatland Township, Hillsdale County, Michigan
 Wheatland Township, Mecosta County, Michigan
 Wheatland Township, Sanilac County, Michigan

Michigan township disambiguation pages